E. Scott Geller (born February 7, 1942) is a behavioral psychologist, and currently an Alumni Distinguished Professor of Psychology at Virginia Tech and Director of the Center for Applied Behavior Systems. He is the founder of the idea of "Actively Caring". He is co-founder of GellerAC4P, a training/consulting firm dedicated to teaching and spreading the Actively Caring for People (AC4P) Movement worldwide. He is co-founder and Senior Partner of Safety Performance Solutions, Inc., a training and consulting organization specializing in behavior-based safety since 1995.

Education 
Scott Geller graduated from The College of Wooster in 1964 with Bachelors of Arts in Pre-Medicine Studies. Geller graduated from Southern Illinois University Carbondale in 1969 with a PhD in Applied Psychology.

Ted Talk 
On  December 5, 2013, Tedx Talks upload a Scott Geller's Ted Talk from TedxVirginiaTech to YouTube. The clip has amassed more than 10 million views and 150,000 likes

Books Published 
Working Safe: How to Help People Actively Care for Health and Safety (1996)

The Participation Factor: How to Increase Involvement in Occupational Safety (2008)

Actively Caring for People: Cultivating a Culture of Compassion (2012)

Applied Psychology: Actively Caring for People (2016)

Actively Caring for People's Safety: How to Cultivate a Brother's/Sister's Keeper Work Culture (2017)

References

External links 
 E. Scott Geller's Virginia Tech webpage
 GoogleScholar

Virginia Tech faculty
21st-century American psychologists
1942 births
Living people
20th-century American psychologists